Farmtown is a village in the Moray council area of Scotland.

Farmtown lies on the junction of the A95 and B9117 roads east of the town of Keith.

Villages in Moray